Robert Montgomerie may refer to:

 Robert Montgomerie (fencer) (1880–1939), British Olympic fencer
 Robert Montgomerie (cricketer) (born 1937), English cricketer
 Robert Montgomerie (novelist), British novelist
 Robert Montgomerie (archbishop), Scottish archbishop of Glasgow

See also
Robert Montgomery (disambiguation)